John (Danish, Norwegian and ; né Johannes) (2 February 1455 – 20 February 1513) was a Scandinavian monarch under the Kalmar Union. He was king of Denmark (1481–1513), Norway (1483–1513) and as John II Sweden (1497–1501). From 1482 to 1513, he was concurrently duke of Schleswig and Holstein in joint rule with his brother Frederick.

The three most important political goals of King John were the restoration of the Kalmar Union, reduction of the dominance of the Hanseatic League, and the building of a strong Danish royal power.

Biography

Early life
John was born at Aalborghus Castle, in the city of Aalborg in Northern Jutland. He was the third but eldest surviving son of Christian I of Denmark and Dorothea of Brandenburg, daughter of Margrave John of Brandenburg. In 1478, he married Christina of Saxony, granddaughter of Frederick the Gentle of Saxony. This produced the following offspring: Christian II, Francis, Knud, and Elisabeth, who later married as princess of Brandenburg. From about 1496 until 1512, he had a relationship with Edele Jernskjæg.

Reign
In 1458, King Christian I, the father of John, had the Norwegian Council of the Realm commit to electing Christian's eldest son as next king of Norway upon his death. A similar declaration was made in Sweden. In 1467, John was hailed as successor to the throne in Denmark. John used the title heir to the throne of Norway, in line with Norway's old status as a hereditary kingdom, but this was a claim the Norwegian Council did not immediately recognise. Consequently, upon King Christian's death in May 1481, John's position was unchallenged in Denmark, whereas in Norway the Council of the Realm assumed royal authority, and an interregnum ensued. No serious rival candidates to the Norwegian throne existed, but the council was determined to demonstrate Norway's status as a sovereign kingdom. A meeting between the Councils of Denmark, Sweden and Norway was appointed for 13 January 1483 at Halmstad, to work out the terms for electing John as king—his håndfæstning. The Swedish Council failed to turn up at the meeting, but the Norwegian and Danish councils proceeded to produce a joint declaration containing the terms for John's rule, and electing him king. It was hoped that Sweden would later accept the same document and thereby acknowledge John as king. Subsequently, John was crowned King of Denmark in Copenhagen on 18 May, and King of Norway in Trondheim on 20 July.

During the first years of his rule John carried out a balancing policy. By diplomatic means he tried to weaken the position of the Swedish regent Sten Sture, and he also sought new allies—he was the first Danish king to establish political cooperation with Russia. After the 1493 treaty, Ivan III of Russia imprisoned all Hanseatic merchants trading in Novgorod and instigated the Russo-Swedish War (1496–1499). The Hanseatic cities were also troubled by a secret war by Danish privateers. At that time the position of the Hansabund was slowly but steadily declining because of changes in trade routes and the growing opposition against the Hanseatic League in the Northern European naval states.

John's domestic policies were marked by economic support of the Danish merchants and by the widespread use of commoners as officials or even as councillors, something which angered the nobility. The most important of his initiatives was perhaps establishing a permanent Danish navy, one which came to play a role during his later years.

According to the Privilege of Ribe the Noble Diets of the duchies of Schleswig and Holstein were to elect a duke among the sons of the previous duke. Many nobles in Schleswig and Holstein preferred John's much younger brother Frederick, but John successfully argued for electing both the late king's sons as co-dukes. Although it was initially agreed they should govern the duchies jointly, at the majority of Frederick (in 1490) the duchies were nevertheless divided.

In the meantime, John had initially approved to join a crusade plan as presented in Rome on 25 March 1490, in which Nordic soldiers would be part of a coalition of armies fighting the Turks of the Ottoman Empire; however, he sent a legate with a letter to Julius II to explain that he had many conflicts at home, which would prevent him from implementing such endeavor.

In 1495, John set sail with a large fleet for Kalmar, Sweden, to enter into negotiations with Sten Sture on keeping the Swedes in the Kalmar Union. However, John's flagship, the Gribshunden, caught fire and burned down while anchored in the Baltic Sea off the coast of Ronneby. John was not aboard at the time and so survived. He continued the expedition but did not meet with Sten Sture before leaving Kalmar again.

On 6 October 1497, John conquered Sweden during a short and effective military campaign, defeating Sten Sture at the Battle of Rotebro after having undermined his position by winning over most of the Swedish nobility.  Sten surrendered to King John in Stockholm and was reconciled with him. John was crowned King of Sweden, and Sten was given the highest position of authority in Sweden below the King.

In 1500, John made an attempt at conquering Dithmarschen (in today's Schleswig-Holstein), an area which the kings of Denmark had long viewed as belonging to their realm, but which was in reality an independent peasant republic under the loose overlordship of the Prince-Archbishopric of Bremen. By mid-January 1500 John hired the Black Guard of ruthless and violent Dutch and East Frisian mercenaries, commanded by Thomas Slentz, prior operating for Magnus, vicegerent in the Land of Hadeln.

John guaranteed for its safe conduct first southeastwards via Lunenburg-Cellean Winsen upon Luhe and Hoopte, crossing the Elbe by Zollenspieker Ferry to the Hamburg-Lübeckian condominial Bergedorf and Vierlande. From there the Black Guard headed northwestwards again, through Holstein towards Ditmarsh. Together with his brother Frederick, John then carried out a large-scale campaign with the Black Guard, but the Ditmarsians under Wulf Isebrand's command caught most of the Guard in a trap at the Battle of Hemmingstedt after having opened the dykes of the low-land area and flooded the narrow main road. Thus John's attempt to subject the Ditmarsian free peasants to feudalism ended for time being.

The defeat in the Battle of Hemmingstedt on 17 February 1500 hurt John's prestige and in 1501, Sweden renounced him as king. John fought an increasingly more bitter war against Sten Sture and his successor Svante Nilsson, and this conflict meant frictions with both the Danish nobility and the Hanseatic cities, especially Lübeck. In 1509, with the Netherlands acting as arbiter, Sweden agreed to a declaration which recognised John as king of Sweden in principle, but he was never allowed into Stockholm as long as he lived, nor crowned king of Sweden anew.

Meanwhile, Norwegian attempts at opposition were strangled by John's son Prince Christian (afterward King Christian II), who was the viceroy of Norway from 1506 until he became king in 1513. Between 1510 and 1512, the king fought a last war with both Sweden and Lübeck in which Denmark was at first very pressed but, with the help of the Scottish Barton brothers, partly turned the tables with a naval offensive. The result concerning Sweden was the status quo, but Lübeck suffered a real political and economic setback by the peace.

In his own age, and partly to posterity, John has often appeared a "commoner's king", a jolly and plain man with a folksy manner. Behind the surface, however, he seems to have been a hard realist and a zealous political calculator. In many ways he is a Scandinavian parallel of Louis XI of France and Henry VII of England.

Death and burial

In 1513, King John died at Aalborghus Castle a short time after being thrown from his horse. King John was buried in the church of the Franciscan friary in Odense. Queen Christina, who lived the latter part of her life in a nunnery in Odense, commissioned the famous German sculptor Claus Berg to create a magnificent burial chapel, where both she and her husband were laid to rest after her death in 1521. The late Gothic altarpiece carved by Berg between 1515 and 1525 is one of Denmark's national treasures. Each of the three sections is intricately carved and gilded. It survived the iconoclastic fervour of the Protestant Reformation perhaps because of its connection with the royal burials. The son of King John and Queen Christina, King Christian II, with his wife Isabella of Austria, was also interred in the royal family chapel. In 1807, the former Franciscan church was demolished, and Berg's altarpiece and six royal bodies were transferred to St. Canute's Cathedral, also in Odense.

Succession
The 32-year-old heir, Christian II of Denmark assumed the throne but was deposed in 1523. John's bloodline eventually returned to the Danish and Norwegian thrones in the person of Christian IV of Denmark, the great-great-grandson of his daughter, Electress Elisabeth.

Full title
John's full title as King of Denmark, Sweden, and Norway was:
''King of Denmark, Sweden, Norway, the Wends and the Goths, Duke of Schleswig, Holstein, Stormarn and Dithmarschen, Count of Oldenburg and Delmenhorst

Issue
John and Christina had five or six children:

See also
 List of Danish monarchs
 List of Norwegian monarchs
 List of Swedish monarchs
 Danish monarch's family tree

References

Bibliography

External links

 The Royal Lineage at the website of the Danish Monarchy

|-

|-

1455 births
1513 deaths
15th-century Swedish monarchs
16th-century Swedish monarchs
15th-century Norwegian monarchs
16th-century Norwegian monarchs
Rulers of Finland
John 01
John 01
Kalmar Union
Burials at St. Canute's Cathedral
Swedish monarchs of German descent
Knights of the Garter
People from Aalborg
15th-century monarchs of Denmark
16th-century monarchs of Denmark
Deaths by horse-riding accident in Denmark
Sons of kings
Children of Christian I of Denmark
Royal reburials